Team Capinordic was a Danish UCI Continental cycling team. It was founded in 2002 and disbanded in 2009.

References

Cycling teams based in Denmark
UCI Continental Teams (Europe)
Cycling teams established in 2002
Cycling teams disestablished in 2009
2002 establishments in Denmark
2009 disestablishments in Denmark
Defunct cycling teams based in Denmark